Yang Jung-ok (born 24 August 1974 in Gwangju, South Korea) is a Korean former basketball player who competed in the 2000 Summer Olympics.

References

1974 births
Living people
South Korean women's basketball players
Olympic basketball players of South Korea
Basketball players at the 2000 Summer Olympics